Sirens is a book by Chris Achilleos and Nigel Suckling published in 1986.

Plot summary
Sirens is the second art collection by Chris Achilleos.

Reception
Dave Langford reviewed Sirens for White Dwarf #84, and stated that "A treat for the eye rather than the brain [...] People who like books like this will like this book."

References

Books about visual art